The following lists events that happened during 2015 in the State of Kuwait.

Incumbents
Emir: Sabah Al-Ahmad Al-Jaber Al-Sabah 
Prime Minister: Jaber Al-Mubarak Al-Hamad Al-Sabah

Events

June
 June 26 - A Shia mosque is bombed in Kuwait City, killing 27 people and injuring 227.

Sport

January
 January 9 - The 2015 AFC Asian Cup holds the opening ceremony, followed by the first game in Group A between Australia and Kuwait in Melbourne Rectangular Stadium. Australia wins the match 4–1.

Deaths

11 April – Ahmad Al-Saleh, actor (b. 1938).
21 May – Jassem Al-Kharafi, businessman and politician (b. 1940).
4 July – Muhammad Baqir al-Muhri, shi'ite cleric (b. 1948).
22 December – Nabil Al Fadl, politician and journalist (b. 1949).

References

 
Kuwait
Kuwait
Years of the 21st century in Kuwait
2010s in Kuwait